Formerly known as Riverside Park Community, the apartment complex now known as 3333 Broadway is a group of five buildings ranging in height from 11 to 35 stories at 3333 Broadway between West 133rd and 135th Streets, in Harlem, Manhattan, New York City, United States.  Completed in 1976, it was the largest residential structure in the United States. Together, the five buildings include 1,200 apartment units and were designed to accommodate nearly 1,190 families. The complex also includes the KIPP Infinity Middle School.
The present manager of the property is the Urban American Management Corporation.

Site 
To the west of the buildings lies the West Side Highway (NY 9A) and beyond that the Hudson River. To the east of the site is Broadway. Across West 133rd Street to the south is the Manhattanville Bus Depot, and across West 135th Street to the north of the development lies a row of early-twentieth-century brick tenement buildings.

Design 
The architect of record was Max Wechsler of Max Wechsler & Associates. Two architectural consultants to Wechsler were Richard Dattner and Henri A.LeGendre. The New York Times credited Dattner and LeGendre as the architects who designed the housing complex. Seven days later, the Times printed a letter to the editor, from Max Wechsler, proclaiming that his firm was in fact the lead design team on the project and Dattner and LeGendre “served as consultants only.” Richard Dattner claims to have served as the lead designer for Riverside Park Community, along with the 1800-student Intermediate School I. S. 195 at the base of the school and apartment complex.

Facade 
The facade is a typical brick cladding system. The tenement housing surrounding the site is decorated with classically derived ornament, which the Riverside Housing lacks. There is very little ornament or applied decoration on the brick and concrete facade of the building. The exposed slabs at each floor give the building a horizontal element, likely to contrast the immense vertical nature of the structure. This detail is typical of housing design in the 1970s and was inexpensive to build, not to maintain, and the exposed slab was prone to heat loss due to a lack of insulation. The windows were designed to lay perfectly flush within the exterior walls. 

The front facade (where the main entry exists) is pulled away from Broadway to create an entrance. This design was due to the Zoning Resolution of New York City, which a certain percentage of open space was required for approval. The building provided a small public plaza at the corner of West 135th Street and Broadway equipped with benches, concrete tables and trees for shade. These were removed in the late early 2000s once the building left the Mitchell-Lama program, and was completely reconstructed in 2015 to a more contemporary design.

Features 
3333 Broadway is built using concrete foundations and a concrete structure. The floors are built of concrete slab, and they are exposed through the facade. The interior communal spaces have similar modernist elements, with floor-to-ceiling windows, rounded columns and terrazzo flooring throughout. The five buildings are connected using expansion joints, so that when the buildings move, they will not cause damage to each other or fail structurally. The buildings incorporate expansion joints to alleviate damage that could be caused by the average loads placed on a building.

History 
Designed by architect Max Wechsler, the original plan called for 5 buildings arranged in a semi-circle at varying heights facing West 133rd Street. The plans also included plans for a public school, a medical building, a pharmacy and a playground facilities for 1,800 children. The community was constructed under the Mitchell-Lama program, a state-run program created in 1955 that provided low-interest mortgage loans and property tax exemptions to landlords who agreed to provide low-income residents with affordable housing at below-market-rate rents. This project was sponsored & backed by the Brotherhood of Sleeping Car Porters Pension Fund/A. Philip Randolph, President.

At a cost of $54 million, the Educational Construction Fund developed this project as the first phase of a total renewal of the area between West 125th Street and 135th Street, from Broadway to Riverside Drive. When the property first opened, in Spring 1976, the director of sales received over 9,000 applications in the rental office. At the time, a family of five had to meet a basic income requirement of $13,000/year to qualify for housing.  Federal subsidies, however, made it possible for people with incomes less than that which was required to obtain housing in the building. In 1976, a one-bedroom apartment cost $228/month and a two-bedroom apartment cost $272. Today, the rents for those apartments start at $1,900 and $2,450, respectively.

In 2005, after the loan was paid off, the then landlord Jerome Belson controversially opted the community out of the program. Per the guidelines of the Mitchell-Lama program, "any owner can withdraw from the program after 20 years upon paying off the mortgage". At the same time, BSR, the management company for 3333, sold the property to Cammeby’s Realty Corp. for $85 million.

Following the withdrawal from Mitchell-Lama, a class action lawsuit was brought against the current owner by many of the building's tenants, alleging that they were not properly notified of the rise in rental costs and for systematically harassing them to move out and make room for tenants who can afford to pay higher rents. The case was dismissed without merit. At the time of its development, the area surrounding the site of the Riverside Park Community consisted primarily of low-rent tenement housing and mixed-use commercial/residential building types that made up much of Broadway in West Harlem.

Since the previous owner of the property opted out of the Mitchell-Lama program, some housing advocates asserted that as many as 300 residents moved out of the building in the course of three years and some tenants were concerned that the building would no longer be affordable. In 2008, "a group led by the Legal Aid Society filed a class-action suit in State Supreme Court against the building's owner, arguing that a provision requiring that the property remain dedicated to low and moderate income housing had been removed by the City and the prior owners without proper public notice, and that this was a major contributing factor to the efforts to force residents out." Again, the State Supreme Court threw the case out, citing that all claims, including those of harassment, were completely without merit. All attempts to appeal that decision also failed for lack of evidence or merit. The former president of one of the building's tenant associations, Alicia Barksdale, asserted with few facts or precedent to back up her claim, that a handful of tenants believed it was not fair for them to ever have to move, regardless of the changes in the neighborhood.  

In 2007, Cammeby’s sold the property as part of a larger portfolio for $278 million to Urban American Management. Since the change of ownership Urban American has spent over $80 Million improving the property for the benefit of its residents including renovating the lobbies and common areas, and apartments, replacing the entire heat and hot water system, installing class-A storage areas and laundry rooms, new safer and more efficient windows throughout the entire complex, completely modernizing all 15 elevators and installing the largest combined-heat-and-power generation system for a residential property in the City's history and whereby making 3333 Broadway one of the most energy-effient properties of its size in the world.

References 
Notes

Sources

 Yang, Hoell. "14 Injured, Harlem high-rise building that caught fire has a history of violations, complaints" Pix 11 News. News. August 23, 2015 
 Bloom, Nicholas Dagen.  Public Housing that Worked; New York City in the Twentieth Century.  Philadelphia, 2008.
 Croghan, Lore.  “Affordable housing disappearing; Mitchell-Lama woes.”  Save Mitchell-Lama.  2 Aug, 2009.
 Del Signore, John.  “Tenants Sue Owner of Big Harlem Building Over Displacement Tactics.”  Gothamist.  16 Oct, 2008.
 Fuerst, J.S.  When Public Housing was Paradise.  Connecticut, 2005.
 Hosagrahor, Jyoti.  Indigenous Modernities: negotiating architecture and urbanism.  London, 2005.
 Momemi, Jamshid.  Race, Ethnicity, and Minority in the United States.  Connecticut, 1986.
 Schmitz, Corcoran, Gournay, Kuhnert, Pyatok, Retsinas, and Scully.  Affordable Housing; Designing and American Asset.  Washington, D.C. 2005.
 Stegman, Michael.  Dynamics of Rental Housing in New York City.  New York, 1982.
 Wechsler, Max.  “Project in Harlem.”  New York Times 20 June 1976.
 Wechsler, Max.  “Somebody, Wake Up!”  New York Times 7 Nov 1976.
 Williams, Lena.  “A Giant Looks Out Over Harlem.”  New York Times 13 June 1976.
 Williams, Timothy.  “Eviction Anxiety Rattles a Formerly Subsidized Upper Manhattan Building.”    New York Times 15 Oct 2008.
 Display Ad.  New York Times 25 April 1976.

1976 establishments in New York City
Broadway (Manhattan)
Buildings and structures completed in 1976
Harlem
Residential skyscrapers in Manhattan